Touhou Luna Nights is a Metroidvania action-adventure Touhou Project fangame developed by Team Ladybug and published by Active Gaming Media brand Playism for Microsoft Windows. First available through Steam Early Access in 2018, the game was fully released in February 2019, and later ported to the Xbox One and Nintendo Switch.

In Touhou Luna Nights, Sakuya Izayoi is sent to a parallel universe, and is robbed of her powers. Over the course of the game, she reclaims her powers and escapes to her home land, Gensokyo.

Gameplay 

Touhou Luna Nights is an action-adventure game, in which the player must navigate around a large mansion, killing enemies and maneuvering through platforming sections, and occasionally encountering puzzles and boss fights. The player controls Sakuya Izayoi, whose main abilities, hailing from her Touhou appearances, consist of being able to stop time, and throw knives. 

Using Sakuya's powers drains the MP (magic) meter, which regenerates very slowly, and the HP (health) meter, which drops upon being hit, does not regenerate at all. In order to replenish either one, the player must find one of the few vending machines scattered around the map, or graze enemy attacks (having enemy attacks reach the edge of Sakuya's hitbox will replenish HP and MP, a gameplay mechanic from the official Touhou games). Like most Metroidvanias, the player can acquire gold (which is used as currency), and experience points by killing enemies. Gold can be spent on upgrades to Sakuya's abilities, giving her new weapons and moves, and improve her maximum HP and MP.

Plot
Sakuya Izayoi, the head maid of Gensokyo's Scarlet Devil Mansion, is sent to a parallel universe that mysteriously resembles the mansion, by her mistress, Remilia Scarlet. Apparently, this is for Remilia's own amusement, but her younger sister Flandre Scarlet disguises herself as Nitori Kawashiro and hijacks the parallel universe in revenge for Remilia using her magical jewels to create Luna Nights without permission. After Sakuya defeats Flandre, Remilia apologizes and undoes Luna Nights.

In the game's alternate ending, the real Nitori discovers that the world is collapsing and sends Sakuya to investigate. She finds Reimu Hakurei had infiltrated the parallel universe as it is affecting the real Gensokyo. After they fight, Remilia, Nitori, and Flandre arrive and explain to everyone that the purpose of Luna Nights is to create a universe where Flandre could freely use her powers to avoid creating an incident in the real Gensokyo, but were unsuccessful leading to Reimu's appearance. The spiritual energy built up during the fight causes the universe to collapse, with Sakuya barely escaping in Nitori's mech.

Characters

With the exception of Nitori, all of the characters in Touhou Luna Nights are either the protagonists of the series or are from Embodiment of Scarlet Devil.

Sakuya Izayoi – The main protagonist, head maid of the Scarlet Devil Mansion.
Hong Meiling – First boss, a Chinese martial artist, and the Scarlet Devil Mansion's gatekeeper.
Marisa Kirisame – Second boss, a human magician.
Patchouli Knowledge – Third boss, a solitary magician and librarian that resides in the Scarlet Devil Mansion's library.
Remilia Scarlet – Fourth boss, a vampire, and the owner of the Scarlet Devil Mansion.
Nitori Kawashiro – Fifth boss, a kappa who fights using mecha and runs a shop. After defeating her, it is revealed that she is Flandre Scarlet in disguise.
Flandre Scarlet – Sixth and final boss, a vampire and Remilia's younger sister. Because of her powers, she is normally forced to stay in the Scarlet Devil Mansion's basement.
Reimu Hakurei – Eighth and true final boss, the miko of the Hakurei Shrine, and the main protagonist of the official Touhou games.
Cirno – Extra seventh boss added in an update, an ice fairy who resides at the Misty Lake, located near the Scarlet Devil Mansion. She is the only boss unavailable in the boss rush mode.

Development and release 
Touhou Luna Nights was launched through Early Access on Steam in August 2018, and had its Version 1.0 release in February 2019. In June 2019, an update to the game was added, featuring Reimu as the game's final boss (previously Flandre), a dash ability, a new weapon, a boss rush mode, and achievements.

The game was released on Microsoft Store for the Xbox One and Windows 10 on September 3, 2020; this version of the game features an additional boss battle against Cirno. A Nintendo Switch port was announced in October 2020. This version, published by Phoenixx, was released on December 17, 2020.

In December 2020, Team Ladybug announced that the Cirno boss fight would be coming to the original Steam version. This update was released on January 18, 2021.

Reception 

Touhou Luna Nights garnered positive reception from critics and holds a near-perfect user-review score on Steam, while the console versions also garnered similar response.  Reviewers praised the fluidity of the movement and gameplay mechanics, but noted that the game only took about six hours to beat, which would leave players wanting more. 3DJuegos Alberto Pastor praised the game's fast-paced action, combat system, intense boss fights, graphics, and high-quality sprite animations but criticized its short length despite the intensity and uneven level design. Pastor also felt that the fighting could get chaotic at times. Oprainfalls Steve Baltimore stated that the game "has some of the best sprite work I’ve seen in years", commending the detailed character and enemy sprite animations, as well as the gameplay and chiptune music. Jeuxvideo.coms Hyiga gave positive remarks to the time manipulation and grazing mechanics, well-balanced difficulty, boss fights, pixel artwork, fluid character animations, and remixed music from Embodiment of Scarlet Devil. However, he criticized the short length, slow character status improvement, and the shopping feature for being very simplistic. 

Nintendo Blasts Juliana Paiva Zapparoli reviewed the Nintendo Switch port and gave positive remarks to the game's fluid and intense gameplay due to the time manipulation and grazing mechanics, responsive controls, faithfulness to the original series, and audiovisual presentation, but criticized the lack of replay factor and additional content, in addition to the large map and unnecessary backtracking compared to the overall length. Also reviewing the Switch port, IGN Japans Fuminobu Hata praised Touhou Luna Nights for implementing features from both Touhou Project and regular Metroidvanias, allowing for the removal of various elements typically seen in the genre, and suggested that the game should be used as a template for future Metroidvania games.

Sales and accolades 
On February 28, 2019, 50,000 copies of the game were sold. According to Team Ladybug, sales reached 100,000 copies after the game's final update was launched in June 2019. Japanese website 4Gamer.net reported that the game had reached 150,000 copies worldwide by August 2020. In April 2021, Team Ladybug announced that the game reached 250,000 copies sold across all platforms. At IndiePlay 2019, Touhou Luna Nights won the "Best Overseas Game" award.

References 

2018 video games
Touhou Project games
Metroidvania games
Nintendo Switch games
Video games featuring female protagonists
Fangames
Windows games
Xbox Cloud Gaming games
Xbox One games
Video games developed in Japan
Early access video games
Single-player video games
Playism games